is a Japanese manga artist. Endo is best known for creating Tista, Blade of the Moon Princess, and Spy × Family manga series among other works. The latter work has been serialized in the Shōnen Jump+ magazine since 2019 and has reached a milestone of more than 28 million physical and digital copies in circulation by the release of its tenth volumes. His other works have been published in various Jump magazines.

Early life 
Ever since childhood, Endo aspired to become a manga artist. His family consisted of one parent and a brother. His favorite actors and actresses are Bruce Lee, Hiroshi Abe, Meg Ryan and Audrey Tautou. His favourite manga artists are Akira Toriyama, Hiroyuki Nishimori, and Minetarō Mochizuki. His hobbies include skiing, basketball, and racket-based ball games.

Career 
Endo worked as an assistant for the manga series Blue Exorcist and Fire Punch. He was mentored by manga artists Yasuhiro Kanō and Yoshiyuki Nishi. Like many manga artists, Endo began his career creating one-shots. Some of these one off stories would have influences towards his later manga. After finishing Tista and Blade of the Moon Princess for Jump Square and finishing three one-shots with editor Shihei Lin, who Endo had known and worked with for more than 10 years, the two began to plan for a series that would feature in Shōnen Jump+. This manga would combine what Lin thought were the strengths of Endo's previous works; Rengoku no Ashe, Ishi ni Usubeni, Tetsu ni Hoshi and I Spy, creating Spy × Family. Lin claimed that the reception for Spy × Family from their editorial department was so good that its serialization was "practically decided" before an official meeting for it took place. Spy × Family would go on to become part of the top ten most popular manga on their website as of 2019. It became one of the most popular anime of 2022.

Awards 
 Spy × Family
 2019: 1st in the web manga category of the Next Manga Awards.
 2020: Winner of the 4th TSUTAYA Comic Awards

Style 

At the beginning of his career, Endo published mature stories. This is especially true for his early titles Tista and Rengoku no Ashe, which are about a serial killer and witch hunting respectively. After working on so much manga with dark tones, his editor, Shihei Lin, encouraged Endo to come up with a more "bright and cheerful manga". The one-shot, I Spy, could be seen as a transition piece between Endo's dark and bright narratives, as it incorporates the mature themes of his early work while still being a "cheerful title" like Lin had suggested. His work in Spy × Family is the first that completely deviates into what is more considered a cheerful manga.

His editor claims that Endo likes to think through every detail of a plot. When proposed with an idea about his story, Endo will quickly point out any contradictions. This along with his need to create deep and well thought-out characters has pushed him into telling stories that show a positive or negative shift in the psychological state of his characters. Endo always seeks to improve the quality of his work, so he reads lots of manga, novels, and books.

Works

Manga

As illustrator

References

External links 
 
  

1980 births
Living people
Manga artists from Ibaraki Prefecture